The Modern Jazz Quartet Plays George Gershwin's Porgy and Bess is an album by the American jazz group the Modern Jazz Quartet performing the score to George Gershwin's opera Porgy and Bess recorded in 1964-65 and released on the Atlantic label.

Reception
The AllMusic review says, "The Modern Jazz Quartet is alive and well in this effort, thoroughly brewing with overbearing optimism. Lavish in orchestration, shining with dexterity, it is no wonder that it is rare to find such a group that can emulate George Gershwin's work with such spontaneity and prowess".

Track listing
All compositions by George Gershwin
 "Summertime" - 5:38   
 "Bess, You Is My Woman Now" - 5:37   
 "My Man's Gone Now" - 7:20   
 "I Loves You, Porgy" - 3:21   
 "It Ain't Necessarily So" - 6:23   
 "Oh Bess, O Where's My Bess" - 4:14   
 "There's a Boat Dat's Leavin' Soon for New York" - 4:18

Personnel
Milt Jackson - vibraphone
John Lewis - piano
Percy Heath - double bass
Connie Kay - drums

References

Atlantic Records albums
Modern Jazz Quartet albums
1965 albums
Albums produced by Nesuhi Ertegun
Porgy and Bess music recordings